The 1958 FIBA European Champions Cup was the inaugural season of the European top-tier level professional basketball club competition FIBA European Champions Cup (now called EuroLeague). It was won by Rīgas ASK, after they won both EuroLeague Finals games against Academic. Previously, they had not played the semifinals, as Real Madrid was not allowed to travel to Soviet Riga by the Francoist authorities. The first game was held on February 22, 1958, in Brussels, Belgium, where Belgian League champion Royal IV, defeated the Luxembourger League champions, Etzella Ettelbruck, by a score of 82–43. The most notable contributors to Riga's first title included center Jānis Krūmiņš and head coach Alexander Gomelsky.

Competition system
23 teams. European national domestic league champions only, playing in a tournament system. The Finals were a two-game home and away aggregate.

Preliminary round

Group A (Northeast Europe)

|}

Group B (Central Europe)

First round

|}

*Series decided over one game played in Switzerland.

Second round
The winners of the three pairs in Group B played against each other, in a tournament held in Milan, in order to determine the two clubs that would progress to the Quarterfinals

|}

|}

Group C (Southeast Europe)

First round

|}

*Union Beirut withdrew

Second round

|}

Third round

|}

Group D (Southwest Europe)

First round

|}

Second round

|}

Quarterfinals

|}

*The result of the game between the two clubs in the tournament of the 1st Round's Group B was used as a result for the 1st leg.

Semifinals

|}

*Real Madrid withdrew as they were not allowed to travel to the Soviet Union.

Finals

|}

Awards

FIBA European Champions Cup Finals Top Scorer
 Jānis Krūmiņš ( Rīgas ASK)

References

External links
 1958 FIBA European Champions Cup
 1958 FIBA European Champions Cup 
 1958 FIBA European Champions Cup
 Champions Cup 1958 Line-ups and Stats
 1958 EuroLeague Retrospective and Stats

1957–58 in European basketball
1958